Phule may refer to:

Jyotirao Phule, a social reformer from India
Savitribai Phule, wife of Jyotirao Phule and a social reformer in her own right
Phule (character), a character created by Robert Asprin